The 2003 National Invitation Tournament was the 2003 edition of the annual NCAA college basketball competition.  St. John's tournament victory was later vacated due to use of an ineligible player.  Marcus Hatten's tournament Most Valuable Player award was also vacated. This would be the last NIT in which a third-place game would be played until 2021.

Selected teams
Below is a list of the 40 teams selected for the tournament.

Bracket
Below are the four first round brackets, along with the four-team championship bracket.

Semifinals & finals

St. John's later vacated the title due to an ineligible player.

See also
 2003 Women's National Invitation Tournament
 2003 NCAA Division I men's basketball tournament
 2003 NCAA Division II men's basketball tournament
 2003 NCAA Division III men's basketball tournament
 2003 NCAA Division I women's basketball tournament
 2003 NCAA Division II women's basketball tournament
 2003 NCAA Division III women's basketball tournament
 2003 NAIA Division I men's basketball tournament
 2003 NAIA Division II men's basketball tournament
 2003 NAIA Division I women's basketball tournament
 2003 NAIA Division II women's basketball tournament

References

National Invitation
National Invitation Tournament
2000s in Manhattan
Basketball competitions in New York City
College sports in New York City
Madison Square Garden
National Invitation Tournament
National Invitation Tournament
Sports in Manhattan